Mager is a Dutch And German nickname for a thin man and the surname of:
 Aviv Mager (born 1953), Israeli cardiologist
 Georges Mager (1885–1950), French musician
 Gianluca Mager (born 1994), Italian tennis player
 John E. Mager (1900s), Managing Director of Bumpers&Company
 Karl Mager (1810–1858), German educator
 Manuela Mager (born 1962), German figure skater
 Victor Mager (born 1966), Russian lawyer

Surnames from nicknames
German-language surnames